Jay Battle, ARBS (born 1966) is a Canadian/British sculptor, born in Toronto. Battle now lives and works in Salisbury, England, UK.

Included in his figurative work are the series of new statues he sculpted for the West Front of Salisbury Cathedral which were created between 1998 and 2008. These figures are the largest set of statues from one sculptor to be added to the cathedral's West Front since James Redfern in the 19th century.

His abstract sculpture, Pendant Line, has been shown inside Salisbury Cathedral in the exhibition, 'Liminality', in 2010.

He is represented by Adam Gallery and is an associate of the Royal British Society of Sculptors.

Public works

'Vanishing Point' - Canary Wharf, London
'Standing Divide' – University of Winchester

References

Additional sources
 Charles Baile de Lapierriere (editor). Who's Who in Art: Biographies of Leading Men and Women in the World of Art in Britain Today, Morven Press, .

External links
Official website
Official gallery
Listing on Artsy
Listing on artnet
Canary Wharf Art Trail

1966 births
Living people